= Mixologist Club =

Defunct professional association of black bartenders

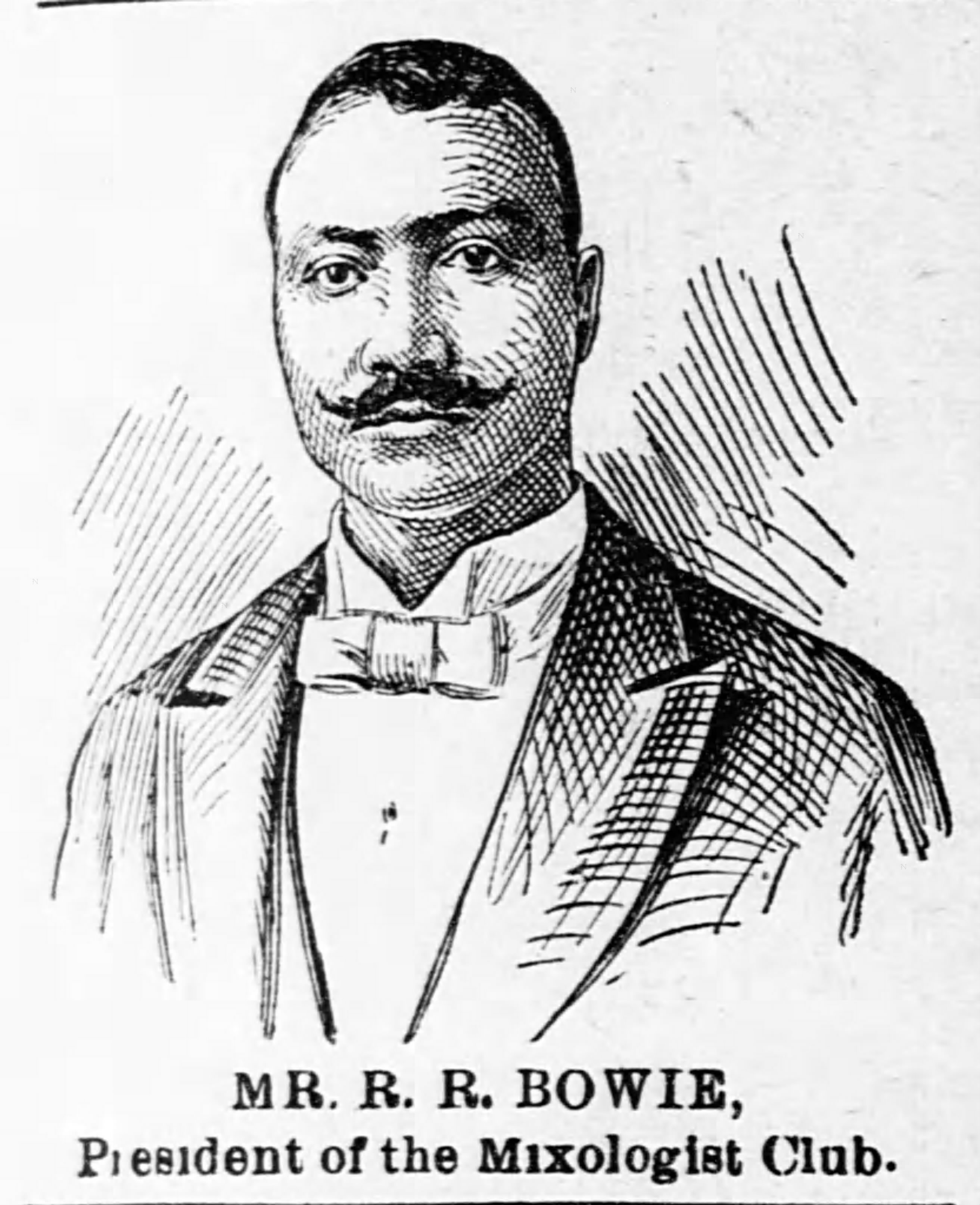
Mixologist Club president R.R. Bowie pictured in 1900

The Mixologist Club was a professional association of black bartenders in Pre-Prohibition Washington, DC founded by Robert R. Bowie in 1898. Immediately prior to the enactment of Prohibition, black leaders estimated that 900 black residents of DC were employed in bars as bartenders or porters.

The group was announced in the Colored American, a Washington-area weekly newspaper, with the following announcement:

"The art of mixing liquors has come to be a highly respectable and profitable calling and men of excellent repute are found in its ranks. To protect the better grade of workmen from the shiftless and unreliable and to stimulate a broader spirit of fraternity, an organization was found necessary. In response to this plain necessity, there sprang up the Mixologist Club, and at once its roll began to scintillate with the stars of the restaurant world, and all of the solid young men of the craft rallied under its banner."

The group held an annual ball honoring black proprietors and managers of "high class" local restaurants and caterers along with mixologists. The mixologist deemed most popular was awarded a gold watch.
